Petropavlivka Raion was a raion (district) of Dnipropetrovsk Oblast, southeastern-central Ukraine. Its administrative centre was located at the urban-type settlement of Petropavlivka. The raion was abolished on 18 July 2020 as part of the administrative reform of Ukraine, which reduced the number of raions of Dnipropetrovsk Oblast to seven. The area of Petropavlivka Raion was merged into Synelnykove Raion.

At the time of disestablishment, the raion consisted of four hromadas:
 Bohynivka rural hromada with the administration in the selo of Bohynivka;
 Mykolaivka rural hromada with the administration in the selo of Mykolaivka;
 Petropavlivka settlement hromada with the administration in Petropavlivka;
 Ukrainske rural hromada with the administration in the settlement of Ukrainske.

References

Former raions of Dnipropetrovsk Oblast
1923 establishments in Ukraine
Ukrainian raions abolished during the 2020 administrative reform